Lovely Memory (Spanish: Bello recuerdo) is a 1961 Mexican-Spanish musical drama film directed by Antonio del Amo and starring Joselito, Libertad Lamarque and Sara García.

The film's sets were designed by Sigfrido Burmann.

Cast
 Joselito as Joselito  
 Libertad Lamarque as Lucy  
 Sara García as Dona Sara  
 Roberto Camardiel as Ramon  
 Salvador Soler Marí 
 Antonio Gandía 
 Félix Fernández 
 Manuel de Juan 
 Aníbal Vela 
 Pilar Gómez Ferrer 
 Pedrín Fernández 
 Juan Cortés 
 Tito García 
 Maleni Castro 
 Santiago Pardo

References

Bibliography 
 Bentley, Bernard. A Companion to Spanish Cinema. Boydell & Brewer 2008.
 de España, Rafael. Directory of Spanish and Portuguese film-makers and films. Greenwood Press, 1994.
 Manuel Palacio & Jörg Türschmann. Transnational Cinema in Europe. LIT Verlag Münster, 2013.

External links 
 

1960s musical drama films
Spanish musical drama films
1961 films
Mexican musical drama films
1960s Spanish-language films
Films directed by Antonio del Amo
1961 drama films
1960s Spanish films
1960s Mexican films